Yeah, right may refer to:
 Yeah Right!, a skateboarding video
 Yeah Right! Records, an independent record label based in London, Ontario, Canada
 Yeah Right (Dionne Bromfield song)
 Yeah Right (Joji song)
 "Yeah, Right", a song by The Reverend Horton Heat from their 1994 album Liquor in the Front
 "Yeah Right", a song by Dinosaur Jr., from their 1994 album Without a Sound
 "Yeah Right", a song by Vince Staples from the album Big Fish Theory